Greig may refer to:

People
Greig (name)

Places

United States
 Greig, New York, a town in Lewis County, New York
 Cape Greig in Alaska

Canada
 Greig Lake (Saskatchewan), a lake in Saskatchewan
 Greig Lake (Vancouver Island), a lake in British Columbia

Other uses
 David Greig (supermarket), a former UK supermarket chain, now part of the Co-operative Group
 Greig cephalopolysyndactyly syndrome
 Greig City Academy

See also
 Grieg (disambiguation)